Sinabelkirchen is a municipality in the district of Weiz in the Austrian state of Styria.

Geography
Sinablekirchen lies in the Ilz valley in the middle of the east Styrian hills.

References

Cities and towns in Weiz District